Nadezhda Georgieva (born 7 September 1961) is a Bulgarian former sprinter. She won a silver medal in the sprint relay at the 1986 European Championships and reached the 200 metres final at the 1987 World Championships. She also represented her country at the 1988 Seoul Olympics.

Career
Born in Gabrovo, Georgieva was a member of the club CSKA Sofia. Prevented from competing at the 1984 Los Angeles Olympics because of the Soviet-led boycott, she did win two medals at the 1984 Friendship Games, with bronze in the 200 metres and gold in the 4 x 100 metres relay. She added a silver medal in the relay at the 1986 European Championships. She had one of her best seasons in 1987, including finishing second in the 200 metres at the European Cup in Prague and finishing seventh in the 200 metres final at the World Championships in Rome. She competed at the 1988 Seoul Olympics, where she was eliminated in the semifinals of the 200 metres, missing out on the final by one place.

Personal bests
 100 metres – 11.09 secs (1983)
 200 metres – 22.42 secs (1983)

International competitions

References

1961 births
Living people
Bulgarian female sprinters
Athletes (track and field) at the 1988 Summer Olympics
Olympic athletes of Bulgaria
People from Gabrovo
Olympic female sprinters
Friendship Games medalists in athletics
20th-century Bulgarian women
21st-century Bulgarian women